The Tender Bar is a 2021 American coming-of-age film directed by George Clooney from a screenplay by William Monahan. Adapted from the 2005 memoir of the same name by J. R. Moehringer, it recounts Moehringer's life growing up on Long Island. It stars Ben Affleck, Tye Sheridan, Daniel Ranieri, Lily Rabe, and Christopher Lloyd. It was the final film appearance of Sondra James before her death in September 2021.

It received a limited release on December 17, 2021 by Amazon Studios; then was widely released on December 22, prior to its streaming debut on Prime Video on January 7, 2022. It received mixed reviews, though Affleck was nominated for the Golden Globe and Screen Actors Guild Awards for his performance.

Plot
In 1973, nine-year-old JR Maguire and his mother Dorothy move back in with her parents on Long Island. Abandoned by his deadbeat father Johnny, a radio DJ known as "the Voice", JR grows up with his mother's working class family. He finds a surrogate father in his uncle Charlie, the owner of a local bar, "The Dickens".

JR often listens to the Voice on the radio, and Johnny calls with plans to take him to a baseball game, but fails to show up and later flees the state. Imparting life lessons to JR, Charlie shares his love of reading and encourages him to become a writer, while Dorothy is determined that her son will have the college education she never had. Though her own well-educated father never made anything of his life, she insists that JR will one day attend Harvard or Yale and become a lawyer.

Johnny makes a brief visit, beating up Charlie when he heckles him for his absence in JR's life. Confronting a school psychologist for exploiting JR to hit on Dorothy, Charlie is impressed by his nephew's writing. JR's grandfather accompanies him to a father-and-son breakfast, and explains that Dorothy is having her cancerous thyroid removed. She recovers, and JR's knack for word puzzles earns him a spot in Charlie and his friends' bowling league. 

As a teenager, JR has an interview at Yale and meets a priest on the train to New Haven. He is admitted to the university, to his family's delight, and later brings his roommates home to meet Charlie, having their first of-age drinks at The Dickens. JR strikes up a romance with his classmate Sidney, who brings him home to Westport, Connecticut. After sneaking him up to her room for the night, she reveals that she is seeing someone else, leading to an uncomfortable breakfast with her "lower-upper-middle class" parents before he departs.

Continuing his studies, JR encounters the same priest on the train, and is unsuccessful in winning Sidney back. Graduating in 1986, he receives one of his father's sporadic phone calls. JR presents his mother with a class ring, but disappoints her by eschewing law school and moving home to work on his novel. Ignoring his friend Wesley's advice, he continues to pursue Sidney with guidance from Charlie, and is hired as a trainee at The New York Times.

Learning that Sidney has married her college boyfriend, JR is let go from the Times. Charlie is briefly hospitalized, and encourages JR to incorporate his recent setbacks into his novel. On Charlie's advice, JR finds his father in North Carolina, but realizes that he remains an abusive alcoholic. Johnny assaults his girlfriend and JR has him arrested, finally standing up to his father.

Returning home, where his mother has found a new job, JR moves to Manhattan, but not before Charlie gives him his car. Charlie and his drinking buddies see his nephew off, and JR is determined to prove himself as a writer. During the credits, young JR spends a day at the beach with Charlie and his friends.

Cast
 Ben Affleck as Charlie Maguire
 Tye Sheridan as JR Maguire
 Daniel Ranieri as young JR 
 Ron Livingston as future JR
 Lily Rabe as Dorothy Maguire
 Christopher Lloyd as Grandpa Maguire
 Max Martini as "The Voice"; Johnny Michaels, JR's father
 Sondra James as Grandma Maguire
 Michael Braun as Bobo
 Matthew Delamater as Joey D
 Max Casella as Chief
 Rhenzy Feliz as Wesley
 Ivan Leung as Jimmy
 Briana Middleton as Sidney

Production
The project initially began development in 2013 at Sony Pictures and Chernin Entertainment, with Ted Melfi set as writer and director. Upon his exit, Sony placed the project into turnaround, with Amazon Studios picking up the rights in July 2020. George Clooney entered negotiations to direct the film from a screenplay by William Monahan. Clooney was also attached to produce the film alongside his Smokehouse Pictures producing partner Grant Heslov. Ted Hope was also announced as a producer under his first-look deal at Amazon Studios.

Clooney was confirmed as director in December 2020, with Ben Affleck entering negotiations to star. Affleck's role was confirmed in February 2021, along with the casting of Tye Sheridan and Lily Rabe as the leads. In March 2021, Christopher Lloyd, Sondra James, Max Martini, Michael Braun, Matthew Delamater, Max Casella, Rhenzy Feliz, Ivan Leung, Briana Middleton, and Daniel Ranieri joined the cast.

Principal photography began on February 22, 2021 at various locations in Eastern Massachusetts, and concluded on April 14. Filming sites included the Belvidere neighborhood of Lowell; Downtown Beverly Massachusetts; the Granite Park neighborhood of Braintree; and a vacant restaurant building at South Shore Plaza, also in Braintree.

Release
The film premiered at the London Film Festival on October 10, 2021. It had a limited theatrical release on December 17, 2021, prior to streaming on Prime Video on January 7, 2022.

Reception

Critical response 
 

A. O. Scott of The New York Times wrote: "It’s not the kind of movie that will knock you out, but it won’t leave you with a headache and a dry mouth, either. It’s a generous pour and a mellow buzz."
Sheri Linden of The Hollywood Reporter wrote: "If it struggles to find a rhythm, especially in the early going, there’s no question that it sends you off on a gentle high."

Accolades

References

External links
 
 Official screenplay

2021 films
2021 drama films
2020s coming-of-age drama films
2020s English-language films
Amazon Studios films
American coming-of-age drama films
Films based on memoirs
Films directed by George Clooney
Films produced by George Clooney
Films produced by Grant Heslov
Films set in Long Island
Films shot in Boston
Films with screenplays by William Monahan
Smokehouse Pictures films
2020s American films